Gothic Western (sometimes referred to as Western gothic and gothic prairie) is a subculture, artistically similar to Gothic Americana, but blends goth and Western lifestyles that are notably visible in fashion, music, film and literature.

History
 The post-war consciousness between 1940 and 1950 left consumers wanting less monster-related horror in favor of dark storytelling connected with reality. I.e., the monster, subject to relativism, survives in the shadows of the idealized American Dream. Westerns were at their peak of popularity, but with the increase of technology, modernization and social changes, not without artistic commentary. An amalgamation of the two genres befitting this reflection was imminent.

In 1971, Johnny Cash introduced the 'Man in Black', stating:

I wear the black for the poor and the beaten down, livin' in the hopeless, hungry side of town, I wear it for the prisoner who has long paid for his crime, but is there because he's a victim of the times."

Larry Vincent, a horror host named Sinister Seymour, established Knott's Halloween Haunt in 1973, one of the first Halloween related events on a large scale, blending gothic and Western aesthetics at Calico ghost town, and providing a first venue for the growing subculture.

Literature 
In literature, the stereotype of the heroic cowboy gives way to a more complex antihero who has experienced trauma or is overcoming personal tragedy, and often associated to the darker side of Weird West monsters and villainy. The novel The Hawkline Monster: A Gothic Western by Richard Brautigan was one of the first to incorporate the term in its title, while Blood Meridian by Cormac McCarthy and The Dark Tower by Stephen King are also popular examples of the genre. The young adult series, The Goodbye Family by Lorin Morgan-Richards, has been considered Gothic Western with an element of humor.

Music
 The mixture of goth and Western music has brooding and dark motifs interwoven into cowboy culture while incorporating themes of death, occult and superstition. Crossover elements are seen in gothic country, but are unique to experiences of the American frontier, including Northern Mexico. The music encompasses storytelling and the cultural diversity of instrumentation associated with the American frontier. The spaghetti western sound of Ennio Morricone is influential to the genre. Pioneers of the genre include Johnny Cash, Jim Morrison, and groups like Fields of Nephilim and Heathen Apostles. In recent years, the music of Colter Wall has helped revive this evolving music genre.

Film and television
In television, Penny Dreadful season three is considered an example of Gothic Western, with vampires invading the West. John Carpenter, who co-wrote the Gothic Western El Diablo, speaks of the unique quality of the genre, noting it is not the same as a Western horror. At the box office, The Power of the Dog and True History of the Kelly Gang have also been referenced as being Gothic Westerns.

Gaming
Several games have been promoted as gothic western, including Darkwatch, West of Dead, Hunt: Showdown, and Evil West.

Fashion
Gothic Western fashion is a mix of Western wear with goth or Victorian era mourning attire, incorporating black and leather elements.

References

History of fashion
1970s fashion
1980s fashion
1990s fashion
2000s fashion
2010s fashion
Alternative country
American styles of music
Country music genres
Cowboy culture
Fantasy Westerns
Fusion music genres
Horror Westerns
Lifestyles
Musical subcultures
Western (genre) films by genre